Dean or Over Dene is a former civil parish, now in the parish of Dean and Shelton, in the Bedford district, in the ceremonial county of Bedfordshire, England. It contained Lower Dean and Upper Dean. In 1931 the parish had a population of 277.

History 
The name "Dean" means 'Valley'. Dean was recorded in the Domesday Book as Dene. On 1 April 1934 the parish was abolished and merged with Shelton to form "Dean and Shelton".

References 

Former civil parishes in Bedfordshire
Borough of Bedford